Lucas Allen Bartlett (born July 26, 1997) is an American professional soccer player who plays as a defender for St. Louis City SC in MLS.

Career

Early career
Barlett attended St. Thomas Aquinas High School in Kansas, where he was a four-year varsity starter, earning Kansas Gatorade Player of the Year and an NSCAA All-American honors as a senior, to go along with Defensive Player of the Year accolades for the state of Kansas. He also played club soccer at Sporting Kansas City affiliated club side Sporting Blue Valley.

In 2016, Bartlett committed to playing college soccer at Loyola University Chicago. In his freshman year, Barlett didn't see any game time due to injury and redshirted that season, but went to make 18 appearances in 2017. Barlett transferred to Drake University, going on to make 31 appearances for the Bulldogs, scoring three goals and tallying four assists. In the 2020–21 season, Bartlett was named First-Feam All-Missouri Valley Conference, and was voted to the All-MVC Scholar Athlete first team and CoSIDA Academic All-District team. 

In 2021, Barlett had an unsuccessful trial at Atlanta United, before going to compete as a graduate student at St. John's University. Here he scored five goals and created three goals in 20 appearances, been named First Team All-BIG EAST and United Soccer Coaches Second Team All-Region.

While at college, Barlett also played in the USL League Two with Kaw Valley FC from 2018 to 2021, missing 2020 when the season was cancelled due to the COVID-19 pandemic.

Professional
On January 11, 2022, Bartlett was selected 6th overall in the 2022 MLS SuperDraft by FC Dallas. He officially signed with Dallas on January 28, 2022. Barlett went on to spend the majority of the 2022 season with Dallas' MLS Next Pro affiliate North Texas SC. Following the 2022 season, his contract option was declined by Dallas.

On March 8, 2023, Bartlett signed a one-year deal with MLS side St. Louis City.

Personal
Lucas is the younger brother of former professional soccer player Alec Bartlett.

References

External links 
 Major League Soccer Profile.

1997 births
Living people
American soccer players
Association football defenders
FC Dallas draft picks
FC Dallas players
Drake Bulldogs men's soccer players
Loyola Ramblers men's soccer players
MLS Next Pro players
North Texas SC players
Sportspeople from Overland Park, Kansas
Soccer players from Kansas
St. John's Red Storm men's soccer players
USL League Two players